The highland elaenia (Elaenia obscura) is a species of bird in the family Tyrannidae, the tyrant flycatchers. It is found in southeastern Ecuador to Bolivia and northwestern Argentina

Its natural habitats are subtropical or tropical moist lowland forests, subtropical or tropical moist montane forests, subtropical or tropical moist shrubland, and heavily degraded former forest.

References

External links
Highland elaenia videos on the Internet Bird Collection
Highland elaenia photo gallery VIREO Photo-High Res

Elaenia
Birds of the Cerrado
Birds of Brazil
Birds of Ecuador
Birds of Peru
Birds of Bolivia
Birds of Paraguay
Birds of Uruguay
Birds of Argentina
Birds of South America
Birds described in 1837
Taxonomy articles created by Polbot
Taxa named by Frédéric de Lafresnaye
Taxa named by Alcide d'Orbigny